Desmana is a genus of mole that contains a single living species, the Russian desman (Desmana moschata). A number of fossil species are known from throughout Eurasia. 

The oldest species is Desmana marci from the earliest Pliocene of Spain. It was probably derived from earlier moles of the genus Archaeodesmana. D. marci likely gave rise to D. verestchagini, who may have given rise to younger species such as the living desman.

References

Mammal genera
Mammal genera with one living species
Taxa named by Johann Anton Güldenstädt
Mammals described in 1777